NEWFM (call sign: 2NEW) is an Australian radio station, licensed to, and serving Newcastle and its surrounding area. It is owned by Bill Caralis's Broadcast Operations Group, and operates at 105.3 megahertz on the FM band from Radio Centre at Sandgate. Great Mt Sugarloaf houses the transmitter site. Its callsign is 2NEW, the 2 being a standard prefix for stations in New South Wales, and NEW short for Newcastle. Its sister station is 2HD. On 24 May 2005, NEWFM reverted to its original 1989 logo which has since been modernised.

History
NEWFM was the first commercial FM radio station in Newcastle when it commenced broadcasting in April 1989.

In 2008 NEWFM became the Hub of the Super Network FM Stations (NEWFM Network) supplying programming from its Sandgate based studios to stations from the New South Wales/Victorian border in the south, north to the Sunshine Coast in Queensland and West to Broken Hill.

See also 
 List of radio stations in Australia

References

External links
 

Radio stations in Newcastle, New South Wales
Radio stations established in 1989
Hot adult contemporary radio stations in Australia
Broadcast Operations Group